Cyril Nauth (born on  in Dijon), is a French politician.

Biography 
Cyril Nauth born on 19 December 1981. He was mayor of Mantes-la-Ville from 2014 to 2020.

References 

1981 births
Living people